Jabari is a masculine given name, derived from Swahili, ultimately from Arabic, that is most commonly given to African-American boys. It is also an Arabic surname.

Etymology
Jabari is a borrowing from Swahili jabari meaning "brave (one)", which is from the Arabic word جَبَّار (jabbār), meaning "ruler".

Notable people

Given name
Jabari Arthur (born 1982), Canadian football player
Jabari Asim (born 1962), American author
Jabari Bird (born 1994), American basketball player
Jabari Blash (born 1989), American baseball player
Jabari Brisport (born 1987), American activist
Jabari Brown (born 1992), American basketball player
Jabari Greer (born 1982), American football player
Jabari Holloway (born 1982), American football player
Jabari Hylton (born 1998), American soccer player
Jabari Issa (born 1978), American football player
Jabari Levey (born 1984), American football player
Jabari Parker (born 1995), American basketball player
Jabari Price (born 1992), American football player
Jabari Simama, American educator
Jabari Smith (born 1977), American basketball player
Jabari Smith Jr. (born 2003), American basketball player
Jabari Walker (born 2002), American basketball player
Jabari Wamble (born 1979), American lawyer
Jabari Zuniga (born 1997), American football player

Surname
Ahmed Jabari (1960–2012), Palestinian militant
Mojtaba Jabbari (born 1983), Iranian footballer

Other
The white gorilla cult in the 2018 film Black Panther is known collectively as "the Jabari".

See also
 Abdul Jabbar
 Jabbar (disambiguation)

References

Masculine given names
African-American given names
Arabic masculine given names
Swahili culture